This is a list of divisions in the Waffen-SS. All Waffen-SS divisions were ordered in a single series of numbers as formed, regardless of type. Those with ethnic groups listed were at least nominally recruited from those groups. Many of the higher-numbered units were divisions in name only, being in reality only small battlegroups (Kampfgruppen).

As a general rule, an "SS Division" is made up of mostly Germans, or other Germanic peoples, while a "Division of the SS" is made up of mostly non-Germanic volunteers.

Waffen-SS divisions by number

Also

See also
Allgemeine-SS regional commands (for General SS commands and formations)
List of Waffen-SS division commanders
List of Waffen-SS units
Register of SS leaders in general's rank
SS Panzer Division order of battle

Notes and references

 
Lists of divisions (military formations)
Waffen-SS